MS, ms, Ms, M.S., etc. may refer to:

Arts and entertainment
 Ms. (magazine), an American feminist magazine
 Metal Storm (webzine), a heavy metal website based in Estonia

Businesses and organizations
 MS-13, criminal gang
 Missionaries of La Salette, a Catholic male religious order
 Młodzi Socjaliści (Young Socialists), a former Polish socialist youth organization
 Morgan Stanley, a US investment bank (NYSE stock symbol: MS)
 Mjólkursamsalan, an Icelandic dairy company

Educational qualifications
 Master of Science, a master's degree in the field of science
 Master of Surgery, an advanced medical degree
 Master Sommelier, a terminal degree in the field of wine
  Mastère spécialisé, a French postgraduate grande école master's degree

Medicine
 Mitral stenosis, narrowing of the mitral valve of the heart
 Morphine sulfate, an opiate pain-relieving drug
 Multiple sclerosis, a disease of the nervous system

Military
 Master seaman, a non-commissioned member rank of the Canadian Navy
 Mess Management Specialist, a former U.S. Navy occupational rating now covered by culinary specialist

Places
 Mato Grosso do Sul, Brazil, postal code MS
 Mississippi, a U.S. state, official abbreviation
 Montserrat, Caribbean island nation (ISO 3166-2 country code: MS)

Science and technology

Computing
 .ms, the top level Internet domain for Montserrat in the Caribbean
 Master System, a third-generation video game console produced by Sega
 Microsoft, an American-based global software company
 Mobile station, a piece of equipment for communication with a mobile network

Units of measure
 Megasiemens (MS), and millisiemens (mS), multiples of the unit of electric conductance siemens
 Metre per second (m/s), a unit of velocity (speed)
 Mile per second (m/s), a unit of velocity (speed)
 Millisecond (ms), a unit of time equal to one thousandth of a second

Other uses in science and technology
 Surface-wave magnitude (Ms), a seismic scale
 Solar mass (MS), an alternate symbol to M⊙
 Mass spectrometry, a method of determining the chemical composition or exact mass of molecules
 Master of Science, a postgraduate university master's degree
 Mesylate, a chemical salt
 Spin quantum number,

Transportation
 Egyptair, by its IATA code "MS"
 Motor ship, ship prefix
 Chennai Egmore railway station, code MS

Other uses
 Ms., a common title for women that does not indicate marital status
 MS (cigarette), an Italian brand of cigarettes
 MS (satellite), a series of four Soviet satellites launched in 1962
 Malay language, of Southeast Asia (ISO 639-1 language code: ms)
 Manuscript, abbreviation (ms.) for a written or typed document
 Member of the Senedd (formerly Assembly Member), Welsh Parliament legislator
 Memoriae Sacrum (Latin for "Sacred to the Memory"), an epitaph
 Multan Sultans, a professional Twenty20 franchise cricket team in the Pakistan Super League

See also

 M&S (disambiguation)
 M/S (disambiguation)
 
 
 
 M (disambiguation), including the singular of Ms
 S (disambiguation)
 SM (disambiguation)
 MSMS (disambiguation)